The Amphitheatre of Statilius Taurus was an Roman amphitheatre in ancient Rome. The amphitheatre was inaugurated in 29 BC. Earlier arenas were temporary structures that were disassembled after the event. The amphitheatre was built by Titus Statilius Taurus, who paid for it from his own resources. Statilius Taurus was a successful general and politician in the time of emperor Augustus and had gathered much wealth during his career. For the inauguration he also paid for the gladiatorial games.

The amphitheatre was built on the Campus Martius in Rome in a period when many new temples and theatres were being built. The exact location is lost, but it was probably built in the southern area of the Campus Martius. Within a 50-year span, this area saw the construction of the Theater of Pompey, the Theater of Marcellus, and the Theater of Balbus, along with the Amphitheatre of Statilius Taurus.

It was not a large amphitheatre. Dissatisfaction over the Amphitheatre of Statilius Taurus led Nero, in 57 AD, to build a new wooden amphitheatre, the Amphitheatrum Neronis. During the Great Fire of Rome in 64 AD, which left Rome in ashes, both amphitheatres were completely destroyed.

In 72 AD, Vespasian built a new, much larger stone amphitheatre in Rome. This was the Amphitheatrum Flavium, today known as the Colosseum.

See also
List of Roman amphitheatres

References

External links
"Amphitheatra," in A Topographical Dictionary of Ancient Rome by S. B. Platner and T. Ashby, 1929
ROMA - THEATRVM BALBI: Rome 100, agrandissement - ROME 100, zoom
Amphitheatre C. Statilius Taurus

29 BC
Buildings and structures completed in the 1st century BC
Statilius Taurus